Enzo Alan Zidane Fernández (born 24 March 1995), known as Enzo Zidane and sometimes simply as Enzo, is a French professional footballer who plays as a midfielder for Primera Federación club Fuenlabrada.

Zidane is the eldest son of former footballer Zinedine Zidane and Véronique Fernández. He attained Spanish citizenship in 2006.

Club career

Real Madrid
From 2004, Zidane played for the youth academy of Real Madrid. On 6 September 2011, he was invited by José Mourinho to train with the club's first team.

On 5 August 2013, Zidane was promoted to the Juvenil 'A' team.

On 16 November 2014, Zidane made his debut for Real Madrid Castilla, the B-team, as a substitute in a 2–1 win over UB Conquense in Segunda División B.

On 12 August 2015, Zidane was named one of the vice-captains of Castilla. He scored his first senior goal ten days later in the first game of the 2015–16 season, a 5–1 home routing of CD Ebro.

On 29 October, Zidane was promoted to train regularly with the first team.  He made his senior debut for the club on 30 November 2016, coming off the bench for Isco in a Copa del Rey clash with Cultural Leonesa and scoring from the edge of the penalty area in a 6–1 home win (13–2 aggregate).

Alavés
On 29 June 2017, Deportivo Alavés announced their signing of Zidane from Real Madrid on a 3-year contract for an undisclosed fee, with a buyback clause. He made his La Liga debut on 26 August, coming on as a late substitute for Mubarak Wakaso in a 0–2 home loss against FC Barcelona.

Lausanne-Sport
On 1 January 2018, Fernández signed for FC Lausanne-Sport of the Swiss Super League on a three-year deal after terminating his contract at Alavés. He was the first signing by the club after their takeover by British petrochemical corporation Ineos that November. He made his debut on 3 February as the season resumed after the winter break, coming on as a 68th-minute substitute for Andrea Maccoppi in a 2–1 loss at FC Luzern. Fifteen days later he scored his first goal for the team, consolation in a 3–1 loss at FC Sion. He scored once more that season, opening a 2–1 win over FC Lugano at the Stade olympique de la Pontaise on 2 April.

On 14 July 2018, Zidane returned to Spain after agreeing to a one-year loan deal with Rayo Majadahonda in the second division. He made his debut on 19 August in the season opener away to Real Zaragoza, received a yellow card and was substituted at half time for Toni Martínez in a 2–1 defeat.

Aves
On 15 July 2019, Zidane joined Portuguese side Aves as a free agent, having previously been in negotiations with nearby Vitória SC. On his second substitute appearance on 23 August, he scored his first Primeira Liga goal, consolation in a 5–1 loss at Rio Ave FC.

Almería
In the last minutes of the January 2020 transfer window, Zidane agreed to a move to UD Almería, returning to Spain and its second division. He was released on 2 October having played only four times, once in a playoff; the team were managed by his father's long-time teammate Guti.

In September 2020, reports emerged that Zidane would join Moroccan club Wydad Casablanca, citing his alleged Brazilian agent Roberto Carlos. However, French journalist  assured that the reports were false.

Rodez 
On 9 June 2021, Zidane signed for Ligue 2 club Rodez.

Fuenlabrada
On 18 July 2022, Zidane joined Fuenlabrada in Spain with a one-year contract.

International career
Zidane is eligible to play for France or Spain, as well as Algeria, through his paternal grandparents. In 2010, Zinedine Zidane stated that he is relaxed about whether his son chooses to play for Spain or France at senior international level.
Enzo made one appearance for the Spain national under-15 football team in 2009. He switched to the French Football Federation, and made two appearances for the France national under-19 football team in 2014.

Personal life
Enzo is the oldest son of Zinedine Zidane and Véronique Fernández, and was previously known as Enzo Fernández. Enzo is named after former Uruguayan star Enzo Francescoli who was his father's football idol.

Enzo has three younger brothers: Luca plays for Eibar; Théo and Elyaz play in the Real Madrid Castilla and Real Madrid youth academy respectively. He is married to Karen Goncalves, and they have one daughter named Sia, born 2022.

Club statistics

Honours
'''Real Madrid
UEFA Champions League: 2016–17

References

External links
Real Madrid official profile

 
 

1995 births
Zidane family
Living people
Footballers from Bordeaux
French footballers
Spanish footballers
Spain youth international footballers
France youth international footballers
French people of Berber descent
French people of Kabyle descent
French people of Spanish descent
Spanish sportspeople of African descent
Spanish people of Algerian descent
Spanish people of Kabyle descent
Association football midfielders
Juventus F.C. players
Real Madrid C footballers
Real Madrid Castilla footballers
Deportivo Alavés players
FC Lausanne-Sport players
CF Rayo Majadahonda players
C.D. Aves players
UD Almería players
Rodez AF players
CF Fuenlabrada footballers
Segunda División B players
Segunda División players
Tercera División players
La Liga players
Swiss Super League players
Primeira Liga players
Ligue 2 players
French expatriate footballers
French expatriate sportspeople in Spain
Expatriate footballers in Spain
French expatriate sportspeople in Switzerland
Expatriate footballers in Switzerland
French expatriate sportspeople in Portugal
Expatriate footballers in Portugal